Below are the squads for the Football at the 1965 All-Africa Games, hosted by Brazzaville, Congo, and which took place between 19 and 25 July 1965.

Group 1

Congo

Mali
Head coach:

Togo

Uganda

Group 2

Algeria
Head coach: Abderrahman Ibrir

Congo-Léopoldville

Ivory Coast

Madagascar

External links
Football I All Africa Games - Brazzaville 1965 - todor66.com

African Games football squads